Odenwald is an electoral constituency (German: Wahlkreis) represented in the Bundestag. It elects one member via first-past-the-post voting. Under the current constituency numbering system, it is designated as constituency 187. It is located in southern Hesse, comprising the district of Odenwaldkreis and eastern parts of the districts of Darmstadt-Dieburg and Landkreis Offenbach.

Odenwald was created for the inaugural 1949 federal election. Since 2021, it has been represented by Jens Zimmermann of the Social Democratic Party (SPD).

Geography
Odenwald is located in southern Hesse. As of the 2021 federal election, it comprises the entirety of the Odenwaldkreis district as well as the municipalities of Babenhausen, Dieburg, Fischbachtal, Groß-Bieberau, Groß-Umstadt, Groß-Zimmern, Otzberg, Reinheim, and Schaafheim from the Darmstadt-Dieburg district and the municipalities of Hainburg, Mainhausen, Rodgau, Rödermark, and Seligenstadt from the Landkreis Offenbach district.

History
Odenwald was created in 1949, then known as Dieburg. It acquired its current name in the 1980 election. In the 1949 election, it was Hesse constituency 21 in the numbering system. From 1953 through 1976, it was number 146. From 1980 through 1998, it was number 144. In the 2002 and 2005 elections, it was number 188. Since the 2009 election, it has been number 187.

Originally, the constituency comprised the districts of Dieburg and Erbach. In the 1965 through 1972 elections, it comprised the districts of Dieburg and Erbach as well as the municipalities of Dietzenbach, Dreieichenhain, Dudenhofen, Froschhausen, Götzenhain, Hainhausen, Hainstadt, Jügesheim, Klein-Auheim, Klein-Krotzenburg, Klein-Welzheim, Mainflingen, Offenthal, Rembrücken, Seligenstadt, Steinheim am Main, Weiskirchen, and Zellhausen from the Landkreis Offenbach district. In the 1976 through 1994 elections, it acquired a configuration very similar to its current borders, but including the municipalities of Dietzenbach from the Landkreis Offenbach district and Eppertshausen and Münster (Hessen) from the Darmstadt-Dieburg district. In the 1994 election, it lost the municipality of Dietzenbach. In the 2002 election, it lost the municipalities of Eppertshausen and Münster (Hessen).

Members
The constituency was first represented by Heinrich Ritzel of the Social Democratic Party (SPD) from 1949 to 1965. He was succeeded by fellow SPD member Willi Bäuerle from 1965 to 1976. Heinrich Klein of the SPD then served two terms as representative before Alexander Warrikoff of the Christian Democratic Union (CDU) won the constituency in 1983. He served until 1994, and was succeeded by Wolfgang Steiger for a single term. Adelheid D. Tröscher was elected for the SPD in 1998 and served until 2002, followed by fellow SPD member Erika Ober until 2005. Patricia Lips was elected in 2005, and re-elected in 2009, 2013, and 2017. Jens Zimmermann won the constituency for the SPD in 2021.

Election results

2021 election

2017 election

2013 election

2009 election

References

Federal electoral districts in Hesse
1949 establishments in West Germany
Constituencies established in 1949
Odenwaldkreis
Darmstadt-Dieburg
Offenbach (district)